Maryanovka is a rural locality (a selo) in Romanovsky Selsoviet of Oktyabrsky District, Amur Oblast, Russia. The population was 164 as of 2018. There are 3 streets.

Geography
Avramovka is the nearest rural locality.

References

Rural localities in Oktyabrsky District, Amur Oblast